Federal Hotel may refer to:

 Federal Group, an Australian Hotel chain (also known as Federal Hotels, or Federal Hotels and Resorts)
 Federal Hotel, Childers, Queensland, Australia
 Federal Hotel, Melbourne, a former hotel in Victoria, Australia
 Federal Hotel, Fremantle, Western Australia, Australia
 The Federal Kuala Lumpur, Malaysia
 Federal Palace Hotel, Victoria Island, Lagos, Nigeria